Trevor Jackson Darrell is an American computer scientist and professor at the University of California, Berkeley. He is known for his research on computer vision and machine learning and is one of the leading experts on topics such as deep learning and explainable AI.

Darrell's group at UC Berkeley developed the Caffe deep-learning library.

Education 

 1996, Ph.D., Media Arts & Sciences, Media Lab, Massachusetts Institute of Technology, under Alex Pentland
 1991, S.M., Massachusetts Institute of Technology
 1988, B.S.E., Computer Science, University of Pennsylvania
 1984, Phillips Academy

Career 
When Darrell finished his PhD, he joined the Interval Research Corporation. In 1999, he left the corporation for the MIT EECS department. In 2008, he left MIT for the University of California, Berkeley, where he is now a Professor in Residence.

His former students include Kristen Grauman, Louis-Philippe Morency, and Raquel Urtasun (postdoc).

Family 
Darrell is a grandson of American attorney Norris Darrell.

References 

Year of birth missing (living people)
Living people
University of Pennsylvania alumni
Massachusetts Institute of Technology alumni
UC Berkeley College of Engineering faculty
American computer scientists